Atanasije Jevtić (Serbian Cyrillic: Атанасије Јевтић; 8 January 1938 – 4 March 2021) was a Serbian Orthodox prelate who served as the bishop of Banat from 1991 until 1992, and the bishop of Zahumlje and Herzegovina from 1992 until his retirement in 1999.

Atanasije was a long-time professor and former dean of the Orthodox Theological Faculty of the University of Belgrade. He was a leading expert on Patristics and has written a series of books on the subject. Together with bishop Amfilohije Radović, Atanasije translated the Deuterocanonical books of the Old Testament to Serbian language.

Biography
Atanasije was born on 8 January 1938 in the village of Brdarica near Valjevo, Yugoslavia.

Consecration
On 7 July 1991 on the feast of the Nativity of John the Baptist, Archimandrite Atanasije was consecreated as Bishop of Banat in the Cathedral of St. Nicholas in Vršac by Pavle, Serbian Patriarch, Metropolitan Nikolaj Mrđa of Dabar-Bosnia, Metropolitan Amfilohije Radović of Montenegro and the Littoral, Bishops Irinej Bulović of Bačka, Stefan Boca of Žiča, Artemije Radosavljević of Raška and Prizren, Dositej Motika of Britain and Scandinavia, Nikanor Bogunović of Upper Karlovac, Vasilije Vadić of Srem, and Lavrentije Trifunović of Šabac and Valjevo.

Atanasije also briefly served as administrator of the Eparchy of Raška and Prizren in 2010 after Bishop Artemije Radosavljević was forced to resign from his position due to alleged embezzlement of funds.

Illness and death 

He died on 4 March 2021 in Trebinje, from complications of COVID-19 during the COVID-19 pandemic in Bosnia and Herzegovina. He was buried at the cemetery of Tvrdoš Monastery three days later, on 6 March.

Some authors described Atanasije's death as "the possible end of the golden era of theology".

Porfirije, Serbian Patriarch stated that he is one of the three most notable Serb theologians to be recognized internationally.

Patriarch Daniel of Romania stated that Anatansije's body of work is of significant importance to all Orthodox Christianity.

Awards 
 Order of the Republika Srpska, 2012
 Order of Njegoš
 Seal of herzog Šćepan, 2018

Selected works

References

External links 
 

1938 births
2021 deaths
People from Koceljeva
Bishops of Zahumlje-Herzegovina
Eastern Orthodox Christians from Serbia
University of Belgrade Faculty of Orthodox Theology alumni
20th-century Eastern Orthodox bishops
21st-century Eastern Orthodox bishops
Serbian writers
Serbian anti-communists
Patristic scholars
Deaths from the COVID-19 pandemic in Bosnia and Herzegovina
Burials at Serbian Orthodox monasteries and churches